Lifepod is a 1981 American science fiction thriller film starring Joe Penny, Kristine DeBell, Carl Lumbly and Sandy Kenyon. It was distributed by Golden Key Entertainment.

Plot
The story is set in 2191. The latest spaceliner for the Whitestar Lines is the Arcturus, on its maiden voyage. On its approach to Callisto, for unknown reasons, the spaceship's computer, the Main Cerebral, declares an emergency and orders "Abandon ship". Most of the crew and passengers leave in lifepods. Captain Montaine stays on the bridge. Main Cerebral begins to evacuate the ship's compartments of oxygen. Third astrogator G.W. Simmons is caught on deck 16 while it still retains an atmosphere. He runs into Fiona Harrison, a passenger from deck 15, who did not leave with the others because she went back for her bird, Dwayne. Because life support has been shut down for all the decks below, Simmons and Fiona head to the bridge via an elevator. When the doors open on deck 1, they are met by news reporter Roz Keshah from level 3, who is wearing a tiny, discrete, head-mounted optical display/camera (predictive of Google Glass). He has found two people, Whitestar Lines director and major stockholder Lloyd DeMatte and his companion the Lady Lima.

On the biobridge, the five meet Captain Montaine, who is accosted by DeMatte and accused of damaging the Arcturus. The captain explains the situation, then offers an escape tunnel to a lifepod. He remains behind, out of duty as the captain and also a strong sense of curiosity. Fiona accidentally leaves behind Dwayne, who becomes a sort of companion for the captain.

Simmons takes command of lifepod #3; DeMatte attempts to hijack it and is killed in the process. It is revealed that the Arcturus was intended as an interstellar vessel but repurposed for economic reasons by financial-criminal DeMatte. Also, the Main Cerebral is discovered to be the former intended pilot of the interstellar Arcturus, rendered an amnesiac and made cyber-controller of the interplanetary Arcturus by DeMatte; memory restored, he launches the Arcturus on a flight to Sirius, accompanied by Captain Montaine.

Cast
Joe Penny as G.W. Simmons
Kristine DeBell as Fiona Harrison
Carl Lumbly as Roz Keshah
Sandy Kenyon as Lloyd DeMatte
Jordan Michaels as Lima
Christopher Cary as Captain Montaine
Neil Ross as Main Cerebral (voice)

Reception
Monsterhunter has little good to say about the movie, citing a low budget, logic flaws and characters who don't add anything to the story as issues with this film.

References

External links

1981 films
1980s science fiction thriller films
American science fiction thriller films
Films set on spacecraft
1980s English-language films
1980s American films